Profsoyuznik is a rural locality (a settlement) and the administrative center of Profsoyuzninskoye Rural Settlement, Danilovsky District, Volgograd Oblast, Russia. The population was 490 as of 2010. There are 16 streets.

Geography 
Profsoyuznik is located in steppe, 9.4 km from Profsoyuznik, 18 km northwest of Danilovka (the district's administrative centre) by road. Semibratovsky is the nearest rural locality.

References 

Rural localities in Danilovsky District, Volgograd Oblast